Bongbong Marcos (born 1957) is a Filipino politician who is the 17th President of the Philippines.

Bongbong may also refer to:
 Bongbong, Ubay, Bohol, Philippines
 Bongbong (rocket)

See also 
 All pages with titles beginning with Bongbong
 All pages with titles containing Bongbong
 Bong Bong, New South Wales, Australia, a ghost town
 Bong Bong Parish, parish in New South Wales, Australia